The 2007–08 Honduran Liga Nacional de Ascenso was the 41st season of the Second level in Honduran football and the 6th under the name Liga Nacional de Ascenso.  Under the management of Emilio Umanzor, C.D. Real Juventud won the tournament after winning both the Apertura and Clausura seasons and obtained automatic promotion to the 2008–09 Honduran Liga Nacional.

Apertura

Regular season

Standings
Group North A

Group North B

Postseason

Quarterfinals

 Olimpia Occidental won 4–2 on aggregated.

 Unión Ájax won 3–2 on aggregated.

 Real Juventud won 5–3 on aggregated.

 Arsenal won 4–2 on aggregated.

Semifinals

 Arsenal won 2–1 on aggregated.

 Real Juventud won 2–1 on aggregated.

Final

 Real Juventud won 3–2 on aggregated.

Clausura

Regular season

Standings
Group North A

Group North B

Postseason

Quarterfinals

 Águilas del Motagua won 4–3 on aggregated.

 Social Sol won 6–1 on aggregated.

 Real Juventud won 4–1 on aggregated.

 Olimpia Reservas won 5–3 on aggregated.

Semifinals

 Social Sol won 1–0 on aggregated.

 Real Juventud won 2–1 on aggregated.

Final

 Real Juventud won 3–1 on aggregated.

Promotion
As winners of both Apertura and Clausura, C.D. Real Juventud obtained automatic promotion to 2008–09 Honduran Liga Nacional and no promotion series was required.

References

Ascenso
2007